Spergularia is a genus in the family Caryophyllaceae, containing salt-tolerant plants known as sandspurrys (or sandspurries) and sea-spurreys. There are about 60 species.

Selected species
 Spergularia azorica – endemic to the archipelago of the Azores  
Spergularia atrosperma – blackseed sandspurry
Spergularia bocconei (Scheele) Graebn. – Boccone's sand-spurrey
Spergularia canadensis – Canadian sandspurry
Spergularia catalaunica Monnier 
Spergularia diandra (Guss.) Boiss.
Spergularia echinosperma (Celak.) Asch. & Graebn.   
Spergularia heldreichii Foucaud
Spergularia macrorrhiza (Loisel.) Heynh.
Spergularia macrotheca – sticky sandspurry
Spergularia marina (L.) Besser – lesser sea-spurrey
Spergularia media (L.) C.Presl – greater sea-spurrey
Spergularia nicaeensis Sarato ex Burnat
Spergularia platensis
Spergularia rubra (L.) J.Presl & C.Presl – red sand-spurrey
Spergularia rupicola Lebel ex Le Jol.
Spergularia salina J.Presl & C.Presl
Spergularia segetalis (L.) G.Don
Spergularia tasmanica
Spergularia tangerina P.Monnier
Spergularia villosa – hairy sandspurry

See also
Similar genera that have been taxonomically intertwined with Spergularia:
Arenaria
Spergula

References

 
Caryophyllaceae genera
Taxa named by Carl Borivoj Presl